Wendy Witter  (b. February 1936) is a public servant and charity worker from Barton-upon-Humber, North Lincolnshire, England.

Biography
In 2005 Witter was appointed Director of Age UK in North Lincolnshire. She was the Director of the charity Voluntary Action North Lincolnshire from October 2008 until her retirement in October 2014. 

She was an awarded an MBE in the 1992 New Year Honours whilst serving as Chairman of the Humberside Committee for the Employment of Disabled People. 

In July 2019 she was given one of the two annual awards by the Barton-upon-Humber Civic Society for her decades of public service in the town.

References

1936 births
Living people
People from Barton-upon-Humber
Councillors in Lincolnshire
Members of the Order of the British Empire
Women councillors in England